24th Separate Assault Battalion "Aidar", also known as the Aidar Battalion, is an assault battalion of the Ukrainian Ground Forces.

The unit took part in the war in Eastern Ukraine and had roughly 300-400 members in 2014. It was named after the Aidar River in the Luhansk region where it was initially deployed. In 2014, Amnesty International reported that members of the Aidar Battalion had committed war crimes during the war in Donbas. It was disbanded in 2015 and reconstituted as the 24th Separate Assault Battalion of the Ukrainian Army, before being absorbed into the 10th Mountain Assault Brigade in 2016. As of October 2018 the battalion lost 130 soldiers killed in action.

History

Created in May 2014, Aidar was the first Territorial Defense Battalion of Ukraine - a volunteer military detachment subordinate to the Ministry of Defence.

In the 2014 Ukrainian parliamentary election, former Aidar commander  became a member of the Verkhovna Rada representing the Radical Party of Oleh Lyashko; he ranked third on the party's election list. The commander of Aidar's second company, Ihor Lapin, was an MP for People's Front after winning a constituency seat in Lutsk in the same election. Neither was reelected in the 2019 Ukrainian parliamentary election (Melnychuk failed to win a seat in an electoral district in Novomoskovsk with 0.31% of the votes and Lapin was not high enough on the election list (placed 49th) of European Solidarity to get elected).

On 8 August 2014 Ukraine's Defense Minister Valeriy Heletey stated that the battalion would be reorganised, would receive better equipment and would see more combat missions. Melnychuk has described that order as "criminal", but has admitted that most of Aidar's soldiers had demobilized or come under official control by 2015.

The battalion came to spotlight after several dozen of its members were killed in an ambush south of Shchastia after the announcement of the ceasefire on 6 September 2014.

Late January and early February 2015 the battalion picketed several government buildings, which escalated into clashes.

Aidar was formally disbanded on 2 March 2015 "to prevent illegal actions of some representatives of volunteer units" (according to the General Staff of the Ukrainian Armed Forces). After a "careful selection of soldiers", it was then reorganized as the 24th Separate Assault Battalion of the Ukrainian Army. Lieutenant Colonel Yevhen Ptashnik was appointed as commander of the battalion. The 24th Separate Assault Battalion was made part of the 10th Mountain Assault Brigade in January 2016. Later it became a part of the 53rd Mechanized Brigade.

Members and structure 
The Aidar Battalion consisted of volunteers from Lviv, Chernihiv, Luhansk, Kharkiv, Crimea, Kyiv, Ivano-Frankivsk and Donetsk regions. It included a member of the Luhansk Oblast's legislature, a former mayor of Oleksandrivsk, and self-defense activists from the Euromaidan protests in Kyiv. In June 2014, it had around 400 members.

The battalion had several subdivisions:
 Kholodnyi Yar
 Company "West"
 Afgan company
 Volyn company
 Autorota
 Golden company
 Gregory Makles Company

The Battalion has gained notoriety due to its members' far-right views. Two Swedish neo-Nazis from the Svenskarnas parti joined Aidar in 2013 and 2014 and made headlines in the Swedish and German media, since one of the Nazis was running for a local council in elections, and the same media heavily criticized the Nazi mercenaries. According to Huseyn Aliyev, a political scientist at the University of Glasgow, by 2015 the battalion's radical right-wing ideology had "toned down", and the ideology of it along with other volunteer battalions in Ukraine was best described as "nationalist-patriotic".

Allegations of human rights violations and war crimes

In July 2014, Russia began a criminal investigation of Aidar's commander, Serhiy Melnychuk, for "organizing the killing of civilians". Its volunteer pilot, Nadiya Savchenko, was captured by pro-Russian separatists near Luhansk, transported to Russia and charged with killing two Russian journalists.

On 8 September 2014 Amnesty International claimed that the battalion had committed war crimes, including abductions, unlawful detention, ill-treatment, theft, extortion, and possible executions.

On 24 December 2014, Amnesty International reported that the unit was blocking humanitarian aid from Ukraine reaching the population of the separatist-controlled areas. Over half the population in these areas depended on food aid. According to Amnesty International, the Aidar, Donbas and Dnipro-1 battalions said they are blocking the aid because they "believe food and clothing are ending up in the wrong hands and may be sold instead of being given as humanitarian aid". Denis Krivosheev, acting Director of Europe and Central Asia for Amnesty International, stated that starving civilians as a method of warfare is a war crime.

In April 2015, the Ukrainian government-appointed Governor of Luhansk Hennadiy Moskal stated that Aidar battalion was "terrorizing the region" and asked Ukrainian Defense Ministry to rein in its members after a series of thefts, including ambulances and the takeover of a bread factory.

Gallery 

Veterans of the Battalion on the March of Defenders. Independence Day, Kyiv, 24 July 2019

References

External links

Territorial defence battalions of Ukraine
History of Luhansk Oblast
Military units and formations established in 2014
2014 establishments in Ukraine
Far-right politics in Ukraine